Notable Last Facts is a book published by the American librarian/writer William B. Brahms in 2004 and was the first relatively comprehensive collection of important lasts.

Although that work mainly details American culture (TV, Radio, Sports are almost completely American examples), and to a lesser extent with  European culture (in Art, Music and Transportation for example), some sections (Nations, Wars, Slavery, Voting, and Era & Empires for example) do have a broad international treatment. The smaller trivia books on "lasts" by Christopher Slee (cited below) have a treatment that is almost exclusively limited to the United Kingdom. Examples of "Notable Last Facts" include the last surviving participant or witness to a historic event, the last work produced by a major artist, author, performer or musician, or perhaps the last remaining example of a once-prevalent style or object, such as a type of architecture, or a make or model of an automobile, motorcycle, or airplane. Notable lasts are often used a finite demarcations of social, artistic and historical eras or periods. They also serve, often unintentionally, to mark advances, failures and change. In other fields of study, a notable last can be used to assist in dating objects, buildings and artifacts by helping to establish a terminus ante quem or a terminus post quem relative to the date of the notable last event. A distinction is made between a simple "last" (which includes the last time something happened that will likely happen again—such as the last time there was an unassisted triple play in baseball or the last time it snowed in September in New York City) and a "notable last" (which are limited to concrete endings; thus not possible or highly improbable to ever happen again—such as a deceased composer's last work or the last act in a specific war that has ended).

History of the study of "firsts" and "lasts"
"Lasts" only became an area of study once the area of "firsts" (generally referred to as "Famous Firsts") was well established for decades. Today there are dozens of books that have been published about specific areas using the now established term, "famous first..." "Famous Firsts" are often heralded as news stories and may be documented with patents and even with celebrations. "Firsts" have been recorded for a long time and are a widely documented area of study, most particularly in the core library reference work Famous First Facts by Joseph Nathan Kane, first published by H. W. Wilson Company in 1933. Kane was the first to provide a comprehensive collation of "famous firsts." To this day, with each subsequent edition released (now in its 7th edition), "Kane's" remains H.W. Wilson's largest-selling single volume reference work. Many of Kane's entries are actually rather obscure, so the term "famous first" can be misleading; they are more accurately termed "notable;" hence the term "notable last" was chosen for the study of lasts, rather than "famous lasts." The term "famous last" could have not only a similarly misleading connotation, but also be potentially confused with the cautionary words of advice, "famous last words", often uttered sarcastically when an undertaking or prediction is made. Recognition of "firsts" has received more attention given the importance our society places on innovation, ingenuity and discovery. Thus, "firsts" are easier to research and authenticate. A "last", on the other hand, frequently is difficult to track down, as there is not an analogous historical record. A few small trivia books have compiled a limited number of "lasts" (particularly two small British works by Christopher Slee and a generalized work by trivia compiler Charles Panati). These are works that include general "lasts," not only "notable lasts" as defined in the first substantial work on "notable lasts" called Notable Last Facts published by Reference Desk Press, Inc. by William B. Brahms in 2005. Brahms' work was recognized by the American Library Association publication Booklist as 2005's "best addition to the trivia shelf".

Frequently documented "lasts"
Most commonly documented lasts include a last surviving veteran of a war, last speakers of extinct languages, or generally last surviving members of any type of formal, professional or cultural group. These are often brought to public attention at the time of death in an obituary or news story; frequently the facts that a person is a "last" of a group is the only obvious reason that their obituary or death notice would get national or international attention—a cultural phenomenon that underscores the interest in last. When such events occur they are often tagged with the phrase "end of an era". In terms of objects, last examples of architecture or building use or building architect are one potential criterion for inclusion in a State and National Register of Historic Places. Museums will often display last examples of particular objects, the last known work of a noted artist, or the stuffed remains of the last example of a species that has reached extinction.

Notable examples of "lasts"
Daniel F. Bakeman, the last surviving veteran of the Revolutionary War
Hiram Cronk, the last surviving veteran of The War of 1812
Owen Thomas Edgar, the last surviving veteran of the Mexican–American War
Albert Woolson, the last surviving Civil War veteran
John B. Salling, the last surviving Confederate States of America (U.S.) Civil War veteran
Jones Morgan, the last surviving Spanish–American War veteran
George Ives, the last surviving veteran of the Second Boer War
Charles Carroll of Carrollton, the last surviving signer of Declaration of Independence
Philipp von Boeselager, the last surviving member of the group that tried to assassinate Adolf Hitler in 1944
Ishi, the last of the Yahi
Mauritius dodo, the last surviving dodo
Martha, the last surviving passenger pigeon
Benjamin, the last surviving thylacine
Szczerbiec, the last surviving piece of the Polish Crown Jewels
May 30, 1935, Babe Ruth plays in his final game
January 2, 1971, the last tobacco advertising on American television

References

External links
"Corsinet: Unusual, unique, and uncommon facts about a diversity of subjects: The End: Famous Endings, the Last of Things"
Brahms, William Notable Last Facts: A Compendium of Endings, Conclusions, Terminations and Final Events Throughout History 
Panati, Charles, Extraordinary Endings of Practically Everything and Everybody, New York, New York: Harper and Row, 1989.
Slee, Christopher, The Chameleon Book of Lasts, Huntington, England: Chameleon Publishing Ltd, 1990. (Out of Print)
Slee, Christopher, The Guinness Book of Lasts, Enfield, England: Guinness Publishing, 1994. (Out of Print)

2004 non-fiction books
Trivia books
Last events